The Continental Line is a  long railway between Malmö and Trelleborg in Sweden. At Trelleborg the railway terminates at a railway ferry quay allowing rail cars to be ferried to Sassnitz in Germany. A part of the railway is also part of the line between Malmö and Copenhagen via the Oresund Bridge. The first seven kilometers of the line are double track.

Local passenger trains between Malmö and Trelleborg serves the railway with several stops along the route, and uses the old central station building of Trelleborg near the ferry port. The passenger service began to run again in the fall of 2015, after 40 years of non-existence.

Swedish train operator Snälltåget formerly operated a direct sleeper train service between Malmö and Berlin (previously known as Berlin Night Express), using the now defunct ferry link from Trelleborg to Sassnitz, but this service now travels to Germany overland through Denmark.

History
At first called Malmö-Kontinentens Järnväg, the railway was opened in 1898 and was initially thought of as an extension of Södra Stambanan southwards. The line replaced an old railway between Malmö and Trelleborg, the Malmö–Trelleborg Railway, which didn't have good enough standard for the traffic. The ferry traffic service started in 1909, the same year it was nationalized. It was electrified in 1933. In the 1950s the seven kilometers between Malmö and Lockarp were rebuilt to double track. In 1973 the local passenger train line between Malmö and Trelleborg were shut down, but was reactivated again in 2015.

Most of the international trains on the railway were foreign, and until the 1970s there were direct trains from Malmö to Moscow (operated by the Russian Railways), Hamburg (operated by Deutsche Bundesbahn) and Prague.

References

External links

 

Rail infrastructure in Skåne County
Railway lines in Sweden
Railway lines opened in 1898
Rail transport in the Øresund Region